The Northwest League of Minor League Baseball is one of three High-A baseball leagues in the United States. A league champion is determined at the end of each season. Champions have been determined by postseason playoffs, winning the regular season pennant, or being declared champion by the league office. As of 2022, the first- and second-half winners meet in a best-of-five series to determine a league champion. If the same team wins both halves, the team with the next best full-season winning percentage will qualify.

League champions
Score and finalist information is only presented when postseason play occurred. The lack of this information indicates a declared league champion.

Championship wins by team
Active Northwest League teams appear in bold.

Notes
 Bellingham and Eugene were declared co-champions.

References

C
Northwest
Northwest League champions
Northwest League